Sheung Tsuen is a village in the Pat Heung area of Yuen Long located along Route Twisk and Kam Sheung Road in the New Territories, Hong Kong.

Administration
Sheung Tsuen is a recognized village under the New Territories Small House Policy.

Features
, a typical traditional Chinese academy and monument, is located in Sheung Tsuen. It is a declared monument.

Shek Tau Wai, a multiple clan village founded several hundred years ago, which appears on the "Map of the San-On District", published in 1866 by Simeone Volonteri, is now located on the territory of Sheung Tsuen.

See also
 Six-Day War (1899)

References

Further reading

External links

 Delineation of area of existing village Sheung Tsuen (Pat Heung) for election of resident representative (2019 to 2022)
 Antiquities Advisory Board. Historic Building Appraisal. Pat Heung Temple, No. 87 Sheung Tsuen, Pat Heung Pictures
 Antiquities Advisory Board. Historic Building Appraisal. Lai Ancestral Hall, No. 146 Tsz Tong Tsuen, Sheung Tsuen, Pat Heung Pictures

Pat Heung
Villages in Yuen Long District, Hong Kong